Rami Levy may refer to:

Rami Levy – Israeli football player and manager
Rami Levy – Israeli supermarket owner